Michael or Mike Miller may refer to:

Entertainment
Mike Miller (guitarist) (born 1953), American guitarist
Mike S. Miller (born 1971), comic artist and publisher
Mickey Miller, fictional character on the United Kingdom television series EastEnders, commonly known as Mike Miller
Mike Miller, character in the film Air Mail
Mike Miller, fictional character in the TV series The Last Man on Earth
Michael Miller, American film and television director known for National Lampoon's Class Reunion
Mike Miller (singer), member of the band LMNT
 Michael Miller, actor, played the role of Monk in the film Doc Savage: The Man of Bronze

Sports 
Mike Miller (athlete) (born 1959), American football player and track and field sprinter
Mike Miller (baseball) (born 1989), American baseball player
Mike Miller (basketball, born 1980) (born 1980), American basketball coach and former NBA player
Mike Miller (basketball, born 1964) (born 1964), American basketball coach
Mike Miller (American football coach) (born 1970), American football coach
 Mike “Mikie” Miller, American football coach
Mike Miller (golfer) (born 1951), Scottish golfer
Mike Miller (wrestler) (born 1951), American wrestler
Mike Miller (Canadian football) (born 1989), Canadian football defensive back
Michael Miller (footballer) (born 1994), Scottish football player

Other
M. Mike Miller (1929–2017), American politician and travel writer
Michael G. Miller (born c. 1960), member, New York State Assembly
Mike Miller (Florida politician) (born 1968), member, Florida House of Representatives
Michael H. Miller (born c. 1952), admiral in the United States Navy
Michael Horace Miller (1928–2016), Air Commodore RAF in the 1970s and the 15th Commandant Royal Observer Corps
Michael I. Miller (born 1955), American biomedical engineer and neuroscientist
J. Michael Miller (born 1946), Roman Catholic archbishop
Mike W. Miller (born 1951), American politician
Thomas V. Miller Jr. (1942–2021), known as Mike, American politician, president of the Maryland State Senate

See also
Mac Miller
Mike Millar (born 1965), Canadian ice hockey player
Mick Miller (disambiguation)